Jaroslav Gürtler (born 23 December 1954) is a Czech football manager.

References

1954 births
Living people
Czech footballers
Czech football managers
FC Baník Ostrava managers
Al-Nasr SC (Kuwait) managers
FC VSS Košice managers
Czech First League managers
Czech expatriate football managers
Expatriate football managers in Kuwait
Czech expatriate sportspeople in Kuwait
Expatriate football managers in Slovakia
Czech expatriate sportspeople in Slovakia
Association footballers not categorized by position